Daniel Sedji (born 15 April 1927) is an Ivorian sprint canoer who competed in the early 1970s. He was eliminated in the repechages of the C-2 1000 m event at the 1972 Summer Olympics in Munich.

References

External links
Daniel Sedji's profile at Sports Reference.com

1927 births
Canoeists at the 1972 Summer Olympics
Ivorian male canoeists
Olympic canoeists of Ivory Coast
Possibly living people